John Hackett may refer to: 

Sir John Winthrop Hackett (1848–1916), Irish-born Australian newspaper man and politician
Sir John Hackett (British Army officer) (John Winthrop Hackett, 1910–1997), Australian-born British soldier and author
John Hackett (Irish politician) (1865–1940), Member of Parliament for Mid Tipperary, 1910–1918
John Hackett (musician) (born 1955), British musician
John Hackett (Wisconsin politician) (1808–1886), American businessman and politician
John K. Hackett (1821–1879), New York judge and politician
John Thomas Hackett (1884–1956), Canadian lawyer
John Francis Hackett (1911–1990), American prelate of the Roman Catholic Church

See also
John Hacket (1592–1670), English churchman, Bishop of Lichfield and Coventry 1661–1670
John-Baptist Hackett (died 1676), Irish theologian